Lamin Diallo (born 31 August 1991) is a professional football defender who plays for Iraklis Psachna.

International career
Born in Slovenia to a Guinean father and Slovene mother, Diallo was a youth international for Slovenia. He was called up to the Guinea national football team for a pair of friendlies in November 2017.

References

External links
Lamin Diallo Official website
Player profile at NZS 
Lamin Diallo at UEFA

1991 births
Living people
Footballers from Ljubljana
Slovenian footballers
Guinean footballers
Slovenia youth international footballers
Slovenian people of Guinean descent
Slovenian expatriate footballers
Association football defenders
NK Domžale players
NK Triglav Kranj players
NK Krka players
ND Ilirija 1911 players
FK Mladost Doboj Kakanj players
Trikala F.C. players
Egaleo F.C. players
Slovenian PrvaLiga players
Slovenian Second League players
Premier League of Bosnia and Herzegovina players
Football League (Greece) players
Expatriate footballers in Italy
Expatriate footballers in Bosnia and Herzegovina
Expatriate footballers in Greece
Slovenian expatriate sportspeople in Italy
Slovenian expatriate sportspeople in Bosnia and Herzegovina
Slovenian expatriate sportspeople in Greece
Iraklis Psachna F.C. players